The 1976 Virginia Slims of Sarasota  was a women's tennis tournament played on indoor carpet courts at the Robarts Sports Arena in Sarasota, Florida in the United States that was part of the 1976 Virginia Slims World Championship Series. It was the fourth edition of the tournament and was held from February 23 through February 29, 1976. Second-seeded Chris Evert won the singles title and earned $15,000 first-prize money.

Finals

Singles
 Chris Evert defeated  Evonne Goolagong Cawley  6–3, 6–0
 It was Evert's 4th singles title of the year and the 59th of her career.

Doubles
 Martina Navratilova /  Betty Stöve defeated  Mona Guerrant /  Ann Kiyomura 6–1, 6–0

Prize money

References

Virginia Slims of Sarasota
Virginia Slims of Sarasota
Virginia Slims of Sarasota
Virginia Slims of Sarasota